Sargar Dangah (also Romanized as Sargar Dangāh; also known as Sargar Va Zīrgar) is a village in Ludab Rural District, Ludab District, Boyer-Ahmad County, Kohgiluyeh and Boyer-Ahmad Province, Iran. At the 2006 census, its population was 42, in 10 families.

References 

Populated places in Boyer-Ahmad County